Raipura is a village in Jabalpur district, Madhya Pradesh, India.  the 2011 Census of India, it had a population of 507 across 123 households.

References 

Villages in Jabalpur district